Don't Tell is a 2005 film directed by Cristina Comencini, based on a novel written by her.

It was nominated for Golden Lion prize at the 62nd Venice International Film Festival, and also for the Best Foreign Language Film category in the 78th Academy Awards.

Synopsis
Sabina has a regular life. She is satisfied with her job and her love for Franco. But lately nightmares start disturbing her, just as she discovers she is pregnant. Her childhood, spent with an older brother, has a dark secret hidden within her heart, and she goes to visit her brother in America, to try to understand what happened in their past. What is the secret? She is determined to bring clarity and serenity in her life. She finally manages to free herself from her "beast in the heart".

Cast
 Giovanna Mezzogiorno as Sabina
 Alessio Boni as Franco
 Stefania Rocca as Emilia, long-time friend of Sabina
 Angela Finocchiaro as Maria, friend and co-worker of Sabina 
 Luigi Lo Cascio as Daniele, Sabina's brother 
 Francesca Inaudi as Anita, Daniele's wife
 Giuseppe Battiston as Andrea Negr
 Valerio Binasco as father 
 Simona Lisi as mother

Reception

Critical response
The Beast in the Heart has an approval rating of 29% on review aggregator website Rotten Tomatoes, based on 21 reviews, and an average rating of 5.30/10. The website's critical consensus states, "As well-intentioned as it is heavy-handed, Don't Tell mishandles a worthy subject with a meandering and melodramatic story. Metacritic assigned the film a weighted average score of 52 out of 100, based on 10 critics, indicating "mixed or average reviews".

Awards
 David di Donatello Awards for the Best Supporting Actress: Angela Finocchiaro
 Nastro d'Argento Prizes (Best Supporting Actress: Angela Finocchiaro - Best Cinematography: Fabio Cianchetti - Best Producer: Riccardo Tozzi, Marco Chimenz and Giovanni Stabilini)
 Volpi Cup for the Best Actress at the Venice Film Festival: Giovanna Mezzogiorno

References

External links
 
 
 La bestia nel cuore review on European-films.net

2005 films
2005 drama films
Films based on Italian novels
2000s Italian-language films
Italian drama films
Films directed by Cristina Comencini
Lionsgate films
Films set in the United States
2000s Italian films